Joseph Henry (1853–1894) was a 19th-century Member of Parliament from the West Coast, New Zealand.

He represented the Buller electorate from the 1876 election to 1879, when he was defeated by James Bickerton Fisher.

References

1853 births
1894 deaths
Members of the New Zealand House of Representatives
Unsuccessful candidates in the 1879 New Zealand general election
New Zealand MPs for South Island electorates
19th-century New Zealand politicians